Mud Island is a small peninsula, surrounded by the Mississippi River to the west and the Wolf River Harbor to the east, within the Memphis city limits.

Mud Island may also refer to:
Mud Islands, Australia
Mud Island (Ontario), an island of Ontario, Canada
Mud Island (Michigan), U.S.
Mud Island, site of Revolutionary War-era Fort Mifflin in Philadelphia, Pennsylvania, U.S.
Mud Island (Brazoria County, Texas), an island of Texas, U.S.
 Former name of Ballybough area of Dublin, Ireland.

See also
Mud Island Shoal, Bucks County, Pennsylvania, U.S.